Skin (Persian: پوست‎, romanized: Poost) is a 2020 Iranian fantasy horror drama film directed and written by Bahman Ark and Bahram Ark. The film screened for the first time at the 38th Fajr Film Festival and received 6 nominations and 2 awards including Best Film in Art & Experience Cinema and Best Original Score.

Plot 
In a tale of love, magic and superstition, demonic Jinns threaten a man's mother. He must confront the sins of his family and a curse that spans generations.

Cast 
 Javad Ghamati as Araz
 Fatemeh Masoudifar as Maral
 Mahmoud Nazaralian
 Nasser Hashemi
 Hadi Eftekharzadeh
 Ashegh Vali Abdi
 Narges Delaram
 Ebrahim Dehghanzadeh
 Sadigheh Daryani
 Vahid Shirzad
 Davoud Noor Pour
 Davoud Mazloumi
 Amir Vala
 Samad Delnavaz
 Vahid Delnavaz

Reception

Awards and nominations

References

External links 
 

2020 films
2020 drama films
2020s Persian-language films
Iranian drama films
2020 directorial debut films
Dark fantasy films